= Li Xia (entrepreneur) =

Chinese solar energy entrepreneur

Li Xia is an entrepreneur recognized by the Schwab Foundation as a social innovator for the foundation of Shenzhen Power Solutions a company founded in 2009.

== Early life ==
Li Xia had to drop out of high school and with her savings she managed to start the Shenzhen Power-Solutions, knowing firsthand the problems of the electrical grid in rural areas.

== Shenzhen Power-Solutions ==
After a visit to rural areas in India, Li Xia was motivated to start the company in Shenzhen in the Guangdong province of the People's Republic of China to provide affordable solar power to populations off the grid. Currently, her plans are expanding to Cambodia, where the Prime minister has welcomed Chinese investment. Xia also visited Kenya and Ethiopia where there are plans to expand access to electricity through solar power generation.

On the social endeavors of the company, it also distributes solar power tables to marginalized populations to improve their education with preloaded content.

== Awards ==
She was recognized with the Schwab Foundation Social Entrepreneur award in 2024.
